Topside may refer to:

 Topside (Brooksville, Maine), a summer estate listed on the U.S. National Register of Historic Places
 A cut of beef in Britain, part of the round steak in American terminology
 Topside direction, in the list of ship directions
 A fictional organization in the BBC Canada Television show Orphan Black
 Topsides, the upper part of a ship or oil platform
 Topside Bar & Grill, a restaurant in Steilacoom, Washington
 Topside (film), a 2020 American film